Barry Allen may refer to:

Flash (Barry Allen), the second fictional character named The Flash, a superhero in the DC Comics universe
Barry Allen (Arrowverse), the Arrowverse version of the character
Barry Allen (DC Extended Universe), the version of the character in the DC Extended Universe film series
Barry Allan (footballer) (born 1942), former Australian rules footballer who played with North Melbourne
Barry Allen (musician) (1946–2020), Canadian rock musician and record producer/engineer
Barry Allen, one of four young African American men who became victims of Bernhard Goetz's 1984 New York City Subway shooting
Barry Allen Ackerley (1934–2011), American businessman